Sam-Samhitas, refers to Samhitas of Samaveda, which consists of mantras or hymns in the form of songs and are meant for liturgy.

References

Hindu texts